Amalda dimidiata is a species of sea snail, a marine gastropod mollusk in the family Ancillariidae.

Description

Distribution
This species occurs in the Atlantic Ocean off Brazil.

References

External links
 Sowerby G.B. II (1859). Monograph of the genus Ancillaria. In: G.B. Sowerby II (ed.), Thesaurus Conchyliorum, vol. 3(19): 57–67, pl. 211–214. London, privately published

dimidiata
Gastropods described in 1859